Adamdighi Upazila is an upazila of Bogra District in the Division of Rajshahi, Bangladesh.
Adamdighi Thana was established in 1821 and was converted into an upazila in 1983. It is named after its administrative center, the town of Adamdighi.
The name derives from Adam's Dighi, which means Adam's Tank. Adam was a great Muslim saint or dervish, known as Baba Adam.

Etymology

Baba Adam is very popular among the people of the locality, and commands as much respect from Hindus as from Muslims. Baba Adam is said to have been a contemporary of the famous Rani Bhabani (1716–1795) of Natore, who it is said, with her characteristics magnanimity had a tank dug at the place and dedicated it to the saintly fakir in honour of his supernatural powers. This tank, which is a large one, still bears the name of the fakir as Adamdighi or the Adam's Tank.

Geography
It is the westernmost upazila of Bogra District. It borders Joypurhat District to the north, Dhupchanchia Upazila to the north and east, Kahaloo and Nandigram upazilas to the east, and Naogaon District to the south and west.

Demographics

According to the 2011 Bangladesh census, Adamdighi Upazila had 49,600 households and a population of 195,186, 20.5% of whom lived in urban areas. 8.7% of the population was under the age of 5. The literacy rate (age 7 and over) was 54.6%, compared to the national average of 51.8%.

Points of interest

 Kaboi Rajbari (palace) 
 Kalachand Temple 
 Rani Bhabani's house at Chhatiangram.

Administration

Adamdighi Upazila is divided into Santahar Municipality and six union parishads: Adamdighi Sadar, Chapapur, Chhatiangram, Kundugram, Nashratpur, and Santahar. The union parishads are subdivided into 100 mauzas and 179 villages.

Santahar Municipality is subdivided into 9 wards and 35 mahallas.

Transport
Santahar railway station is a rail junction between the main line connecting Darshana and Chilahati and the branch line connecting Santahar and Kaunia. In July 2014 between 15 and 20 intercity and 7 mail trains a day departed from Santahar.

Rail station Chhatiangram is on the main line connecting Darshana and Chilahati. In July 2014 it was served by between 10 and 14 intercity and 4 mail trains a day.

Rail stations Adamdighi and Nashratpur are on the branch line connecting Santahar and Kaunia. In July 2014 they were served by six or eight intercity and six mail trains a day.

Education

There are seven colleges in the upazila. Santahar Government College is the only public one. Private colleges include Adamdighi Rahim Uddin Degree College, Nasratpur Degree College, and Shahid Ahsanul Haque Degree College.

The madrasa education system includes one fazil madrasa.

Notable residents
 Kasim Uddin Ahmed, Member of Parliament, served as the upazila Awami League president for 44 years.
 Rani Bhabani, zamindar, was born at Chhatiangram in 1716.

See also
Upazilas of Bangladesh
Districts of Bangladesh
Divisions of Bangladesh

References

Upazilas of Bogra District